Giants is the fourth studio album by British electronic musician Chicane. It was released in the United Kingdom on 2 August 2010. The album's first official single, "Middledistancerunner", featuring the vocals of Adam Young was released on the same day. The tracks "Poppiholla", "Hiding All the Stars" and "Come Back", which were supposed to be released on a Re-work EP in 2009, are also included on the album. The album debuted at No. 35 on the UK Albums Chart and at No. 2 on the UK Dance Albums Chart on 8 August 2010.

Track listing

Personnel 
Adam Young – vocals on "Middledistancerunner"
Paul Young – vocals on "Come Back"
Blandine – vocals on "What Am I Doing Here (Part 1)" and "Where Do I Start"
Tracy Ackerman – vocals on "So Far Out to Sea"
Lucie Kay – vocals on "From Where I Stand"
Kerry – additional vocals on "From Where I Stand"
Natasha Andrews – vocals on "Hiding All the Stars"
Lemar – vocals on "What Am I Doing Here (Part 2)"

Charts

Release history

References 

2010 albums
Chicane (musician) albums